Kseniya Dziatsuk (born 23 April 1986 in Homiel) is a Belarusian triple jumper.

She competed at the 2008 Olympic Games without reaching the final and the 2012 Summer Olympics.

Her personal best jump is 14.76 metres, achieved in May 2012 in Brest.

References

1986 births
Living people
Belarusian female triple jumpers
Athletes (track and field) at the 2008 Summer Olympics
Athletes (track and field) at the 2012 Summer Olympics
Athletes (track and field) at the 2016 Summer Olympics
Olympic athletes of Belarus
Sportspeople from Gomel